Deir Ibzi is a Palestinian town in the Ramallah and al-Bireh Governorate, located west of Ramallah in the northern West Bank. According to the Palestinian Central Bureau of Statistics, the town had a population of 2,069 inhabitants in 2007.

Location
It is bordered by Ein 'Arik to the south and east, Ein Qiniya to the east and north, Al-Janiya to the north, Kafr Ni'ma and Saffa to the west, and Beit Ur al-Tahta, Beit Ur al-Fauqa and Beitunia to the south.

History
It has been suggested that this was the place mentioned in Crusader sources as Zibi, but this is not supported by archeological evidence.

Ottoman era
In 1517, the village was included in the Ottoman empire with the rest of Palestine and in the 1596 tax-records it was in the Nahiya of Jabal Quds of the Liwa of Al-Quds. The population was 25 households, all Muslim. They paid a fixed tax rate of 33.3% on agricultural products, which included wheat, barley, olive trees, vineyards, fruit trees, goats and beehives in addition to "occasional revenues"; a total of 3,290 akçe. Sherds from the early Ottoman era have been found here.

In 1838 it was noted as Deir Bezi'a, a Muslim village, located in the Beni Harith region, north of Jerusalem.

In 1870, Victor Guérin described the village, which he called Deir Ebzieh, as being: "situated on a summit of very difficult access and contains four hundred inhabitants, all Moslems; some houses are large and fairly well built. I notice with the medhafeh (guest house) a fragment of carved stone which carries the debris of a mutilated rosette." An Ottoman village list of about the same year, 1870, showed that der bezei had 239 inhabitants with 51 houses, though the population count included only the men. It further noted that the village was north of Bethoron, that is, north of Beit Ur al-Fauqa and Beit Ur al-Tahta.

In 1882, the PEF's Survey of Western Palestine described Deir Ibzia as: "a village of moderate size on a ridge, with a well to the west, and surrounded by olives".

In 1896 the population of Der bezei was estimated to be about 279 persons.

British Mandate era
In the 1922 census of Palestine, conducted by the British Mandate of Palestine authorities, the village, named Dair Ibzie, had a population of 262, all Muslim, increasing in the 1931 census to 360, still all Muslim, in 90 inhabited houses.

Of this, 6,418 dunams were plantations and irrigable land, 2,670 were for cereals, while  were built-up (urban) land.

Jordanian era
In the wake of the 1948 Arab–Israeli War, and after the 1949 Armistice Agreements, Deir Ibzi came under Jordanian rule.

The Jordanian census of 1961 found 542 inhabitants in Deir Ibzi.

1967-present
Since the Six-Day War in 1967, Deir Ibzi has been under Israeli occupation. The population in the 1967 census conducted by the Israeli authorities was 536, 34 of whom originated from the Israeli territory.

After the 1995 accords, 27% of village land was classified as Area B, the remaining 73% as Area C. Israel has confiscated land from Deir Ibzi for bypass roads, in addition to 22 dunams taken for the Israeli settlement of Dolev. This included spring Ein Bubin, now used by the Israeli settlers in Dolev for their own irrigation projects.

References

Bibliography

External links
Deir Ibzi home site
Welcome to Dayr Ibzi
Deir Ibzi, Welcome to Palestine
Survey of Western Palestine, Map 14: IAA, Wikimedia commons
Deir Ibzi village (fact sheet), Applied Research Institute–Jerusalem
Deir Ibzi village profile, ARIJ
Deir Ibzi aerial photo, ARIJ
Locality Development Priorities and Needs in Deir Ibzi Village, ARIJ
Civil Administration nixes order to take land for settlement road, June 14, 2012, The Times of Israel

Villages in the West Bank
Ramallah and al-Bireh Governorate
Throne villages
Municipalities of the State of Palestine